Heinrich Friedrich Emil Lenz (also Emil Khristianovich Lenz, ; 12 February 1804 – 10 February 1865),  usually cited as Emil Lenz or Heinrich Lenz in some countries, was a Russian physicist of Baltic German descent who is most noted for formulating Lenz's law in electrodynamics in 1834.

Biography
Lenz was born in Dorpat (nowadays Tartu, Estonia), at that time in the Governorate of Livonia in the Russian Empire. After completing his secondary education in 1820, Lenz studied chemistry and physics at the University of Dorpat. He traveled with the navigator Otto von Kotzebue on his third expedition around the world from 1823 to 1826. On the voyage Lenz studied climatic conditions and the physical properties of seawater. The results have been published in "Memoirs of the St. Petersburg Academy of Sciences" (1831).

After the voyage, Lenz began working at the University of St. Petersburg, Russia, where he later served as the Dean of Mathematics and Physics from 1840 to 1863 and was Rector from 1863 until his death in 1865. Lenz also taught at the Petrischule in 1830 and 1831, and at the Mikhailovskaya Artillery Academy.

Lenz had begun studying electromagnetism in 1831. Besides the law named in his honor, Lenz also independently discovered Joule's law in 1842; to honor his efforts on the problem, it is also given the name the "Joule–Lenz law," named also for James Prescott Joule.

Lenz eagerly participated in development of the electroplating technology, invented by his friend and colleague Moritz von Jacobi. In 1839, Lenz produced several medallions using electrotyping. Along with the electrotyped relief produced by Jacobi the same year, these were the first instances of galvanoplastic sculpture.
 
Lenz died in Rome, after suffering a cerebral haemorrhage.

A small lunar crater on the far side of the moon is named after him.

See also
 List of Baltic German scientists

References

External links
Page on Lenz from a list of famous electroscientists
Biography of Lenz

1804 births
1865 deaths
People from Tartu
People from the Governorate of Livonia
Baltic-German people
Russian inventors
Russian electrical engineers
Full members of the Saint Petersburg Academy of Sciences
Academic staff of Military Engineering-Technical University
People associated with electricity
University of Tartu alumni
Rectors of Saint Petersburg State University
Inventors from the Russian Empire
Physicists from the Russian Empire
Engineers from the Russian Empire